Fudd or Fudds may refer to:

 Fear, uncertainty, doubt, and despair (FUDD)
 A fuddy-duddy or fudd
 Azzi Fudd (born 2003), U.S. basketball player
 Elmer Fudd (fictional character), Warner Brothers animated Looney Tunes cartoon hunter
 Fudd beer, a fictional beer found in The Simpsons, a competitor to Duff beer
 Fuddruckers (Fudds), U.S. fast-casual restaurant chain
 Northrop Grumman E-2 Hawkeye (Super Fudd), U.S. Navy aerial radar plane
 Grumman E-1 Tracer (Willy Fudd), U.S. Navy aerial radar plane

See also

 
 
 Fud (disambiguation)